Jesús del Pino Corrochano (born 9 September 1990 in Segurilla) is a Spanish cyclist, who currently rides for UCI Continental team .

Major results
2009
 3rd Overall Vuelta a la Comunidad de Madrid U23
2013
 1st Stage 2 Tour des Pays de Savoie
2014
 3rd Overall Tour des Pays de Savoie
 6th Overall Vuelta a Castilla y León
2017
 1st  Overall Volta Internacional Cova da Beira
 9th Overall Vuelta a Castilla y León
2019
 2nd Prueba Villafranca de Ordizia

References

External links

1990 births
Living people
Spanish male cyclists
Sportspeople from the Province of Toledo
Cyclists from Castilla-La Mancha